Stanley Silverman (born July 5, 1938, in New York City) is an American composer, arranger, conductor and guitarist.

Silverman's diverse career covers music theatre, film, television, classical and pop music. His work has featured on stages across the world including on and off-Broadway and his collaborators include Richard Foreman, Anthony Burgess and Arthur Miller. He has also worked with renowned directors Mike Nichols and Arthur Penn. Silverman worked with Paul Simon on his musical The Capeman in 1998 for which his orchestrations were nominated for Tony and Drama Desk Awards. His music has been performed by Pierre Boulez, Michael Tilson Thomas, Tashi, the Kalichstein-Laredo-Robinson Trio and pop icons James Taylor and Sting.

Across a successful career as a conductor, Silverman worked on the Tony, Drama Desk and Grammy Award nominated 1976 Joseph Papp production of The Threepenny Opera which starred in the lead role Raul Julia.

Early life

Stanley Silverman was born in New York City and is the son of Russian Jewish immigrants. Silverman grew up in the Bronx attending  public school followed by the High School of Performing Arts before completing his BMus at Boston University and his MA in Music Composition at Mills College.

At Tanglewood Silverman studied with Leon Kirchner and at Mills College with Kirchner and Darius Milhaud. Silverman's Tenso: Afternoon Music For Orchestra, composed for a White House concert premiered in 1962 for President John F. Kennedy.

As a young man Silverman played guitar in a western swing band and developed an interest in jazz music which took him to the Brussels World Fair playing with his college jazz quintet.

Upon graduating Silverman became a regular concert guitarist and worked with the New York Philharmonic, the Boston Symphony Orchestra and The Chamber Music Society of Lincoln Center. Silverman also played guitar at the Malboro Festival, the Ojai Festival and during this period worked with Leonard Bernstein, Pierre Boulez, Lukas Foss and Gunther Schuller.  As a young guitarist Silverman specialized in new music performing and recording many premieres.

Following work as guitarist, Silverman concentrated on his career as a composer and was part of Charles Wuorinen's New York composer-performer group, The Group for Contemporary Music.

Career

Silverman taught at Tanglewood during the 1960s and in 1965 was appointed music director of The Lincoln Center Repertory Theater before joining Canada's Stratford Festival at the invitation of Glenn Gould. He worked at the Stratford Shakespeare Festival extensively from 1967 when he composed music for John Hirsch's production of Richard III until 1994. His career at the Festival was celebrated in a one-off concert in 2013 called Celebrating Stanley which covered the diverse range of material he had composed over almost three decades for the Festival. In 1971 Silverman, along with Lyn Austin and Oliver Smith, was a founding member of the Lenox Arts Center, later the Music Theatre Group.

Amongst a range of noteworthy collaborations, Silverman composed the incidental music for Arthur Miller's 1972 Broadway production of The Creation of the World and Other Business and worked with the playwright again on his only musical Up from Paradise which premiered at Miller's alma mater, the University of Michigan in Ann Arbor in 1973. A recent production took place under the direction of Patrick Kennedy at the New Wimbledon Theatre, London in 2014.

In 1976, Silverman joined Joseph Papp's production of The Threepenny Opera as musical director. The show premiered at the Vivian Beaumont Theater under the direction of Richard Foreman. Of Silverman's musical direction, Alan Rich of New York Magazine said, "This is strong, intelligent music-making, and it clarifies, more than any version I have heard live or on records, the stature of this dazzling score." The production received critical acclaim and went on to earn Tony, Drama Desk and Grammy Award nominations.

During the 1980s, Silverman enjoyed a brief and successful directing career including an Obie award winning production of the Virgil Thomson and Gertrude Stein opera,  The Mother of Us All in 1983. He also conceived and directed the 1986 music-theater piece Black Sea Follies at Playwrights Horizons

Aside from his involvement with theatre, Silverman has worked with several musicians as an arranger including a Grammy award-winning collaboration with James Taylor on Hourglass.

In recent years, Silverman has been a specialist consultant for Reveille TV, Electus Studios and NBC music Specials.

Silverman was honored by the Lincoln Center Institute for the Arts in Education in 2004, having served for over thirty years as one of its founding board members.

Recent activity

Hotel For Criminals by Richard Foreman and Stanley Silverman had its UK premiere in October 2016 at the New Wimbledon Studio directed by Patrick Kennedy. The show garnered positive reviews from critics, including British Theatre's Critics Choice 2016, in particular for Silverman's score:

"The music is immensely more tuneful and memorable than the great majority of scores currently to be heard in the commercial scene."

"The score is filled with rich vocal harmonies and elegant melodies dappled amongst chromatic recitative and horror film discordance."

"Silverman’s score is a rich combination of haunting, discordant phrases and sumptuous melodies that reflect the other-worldliness of the narrative."

"Stanley Silverman’s score is beautiful, enigmatic and embraces the show’s disjointed narrative with its smooth and impressive melodies."

On 26 February 2017 BBC Radio 3 broadcast Anthony Burgess's Oedipus the King with Silverman's score. It was rebroadcast on 19 May 2019.

On January 12, Sting recorded the vocals for Fear No More composed by Silverman performed by the Kalichstein-Laredo-Robinson trio.

Collaborations with Richard Foreman
In 1968 Silverman began collaborating with playwright/director Richard Foreman resulting in several works of music-theatre. Their first collaboration was Elephant Steps which premiered at Tanglewood in 1968 with the New York Magazine calling it "The best piece of new music I've heard in concert all year." A musical recording of the same name was released on LP by Columbia Records in 1974. "A mere Chuck Berry expert cannot judge the quality of the 'classical' music herein contained, although he can mention that he does not intend to investigate it further", wrote rock critic Robert Christgau in Christgau's Record Guide: Rock Albums of the Seventies (1981). "The 'rock,' however, was apparently concocted by David Clayton-Thomas's heir covert and the pit band from the Oslo production of Hair. And any English major can see through the 'libretto.'"

Other collaborations include Dream Tantras For Western Massachusetts, Hotel For Criminals, Madame Adare, The American Imagination, Africanus Instructus, Love & Science and Dr Selavy's Magic Theatre which led to the New York Times describing Silverman as "the brightest talent in this medium to come along since Leonard Bernstein... he could turn out to be the later day Cole Porter."

Influences
Silverman has been influenced by the works of Baroque composers Handel, Henry Purcell, Austrian expressionist Arnold Schoenberg, French guitarist Django Reinhardt, songwriters Rodgers and Hart, and Cuban charanga.

80th birthday celebrations
To celebrate Silverman's 80th birthday on July 5, several concerts and productions are being staged around the world in 2018/9.

 4–5 July 2018 – Tanglewood Festival, Lenox, Massachusetts
Private birthday celebration hosted by James Taylor and Kim Taylor

 23 July 2018 – Stratford Shakespeare Festival, Stratford, Ontario, Canada
Songs from Up From Paradise, Book & Lyrics by Arthur Miller

 20–22 August 2018 – Grimeborn Festival, Arcola Theatre, London, UK
Elephant Steps (opera), Libretto by Richard Foreman. 
50th anniversary production directed by Patrick Kennedy

 10 September 2018 - Belo Horizonte, Brazil
Six Saudades do Brasil for String Quartet (Premiere)
Guignard Quartet

 25 October 2018 - Wallis Annenberg Center for the Performing Arts, Los Angeles
American Friends of the Israel Philharmonic Orchestra to Honor Stanley Silverman.
The Israel Philharmonic will perform a program including works composed by Stanley Silverman.

 Late 2019 – ALBUM, In Celebration, Trio No.1 – The Piano Trios of Stanley Silverman
The Kalichstein-Laredo-Robinson Trio with Guest Artist Sting

In Celebration, Trio No. 1 is included on Chamber Music America's list of 100 best chamber pieces written by an American.

 2018-2019 – Kalichstein-Laredo-Robinson Trio tour
Trio No. 2 “Reveille”

Personal life
In 1966, Silverman married former VP of BBC America and theatre and television producer and executive Mary Silverman (née Delson); the couple had one child, Ben, chairman and 
co-CEO of Propagate and former NBC co-chairman. With Mary, Silverman also raised artist and illustrator Sarah Delson.  In 1980 Silverman married Martha Caplin, a founding member and 1st Violin, Primavera Quartet and the Orpheus Chamber Orchestra. The couple has one child, Rena, a journalist and photography writer.

Theatre

Music theatre
Elephant Steps
 1968:  Tanglewood
 1970:  Hunter Playhouse, New York & Lake George Opera
 2018:  Arcola Theatre, London

The Satyricon
 1969:  Stratford Festival, Canada

Dream Tantras for Western Massachusetts
 1971:  Commemorating the opening of the Lenox Arts Center, Lenox, Massachusetts

Dr. Selavy's Magic Theatre 
 1972:  Lenox Arts Center
 1972-73: Mercer Arts Center, New York
 1973:  Wisdom Bridge Theatre, Chicago
 1978:  Oxford Playhouse, U.K.
 1985:  New York Off-Broadway Revival (Music Theatre Group)
 2014:  New Wimbledon Theatre, U.K.

Hotel for Criminals
 1974:  Lenox Arts Center
 1975:  Westbeth Theatre, New York
 1977: Berkeley Repertory Theatre, California
 1977: Lyon Opera, FR
 2009: Provincetown Playhouse
 2016:  New Wimbledon Theatre, U.K.		

The American Imagination
 1978:  Music Theatre Group, New York

Madame Adare
 1980:  New York City Opera, Lincoln Center

The Columbine String Quartet Tonight
 1981: Music Theatre Group, Off Broadway
 1981: Wolf Trap Theatre

Up from Paradise
 1977: Kennedy Center
 1981:  Whitney Museum
 1982:  Off-Broadway
 1987:  Great Lakes Shakespeare Festival
 2014:  New Wimbledon Theatre, U.K.
 2018:  Stratford Festival, Canada

Africanus Instructus
 1986: Music Theatre Group, New York
 1986: Festival d'Automne, Centre Pompidou, Paris 
 1986: Festival de Otono, Teatro Monumental, Madrid
 1986: Festival de Lille, l'Opera

A Good Life
 1986: Kennedy Center, Washington DC

Paradise for the Worried
 1989:  Lenox Arts Center, Massachusetts 
 1990:  Music Theatre Group, New York

Love and Science
 1990:  Music Theatre Group, Lenox, Mass. 
 1991:  Music Theatre Group, New York 
 1993:  Houston Grand Opera, Houston

Celebrating Stanley (Revue)
 2013:  Stratford Shakespeare Festival, Ontario, Canada

Celebrating Silverman (Revue)
 2014:  London Hippodrome, London

Incidental music
Broadway
 1969:  The Watering Place
 1972:  The Creation of the World and Other Business
 1978:  Stages
 1980:  Bent  (Nominated - Drama Desk Award)
 1981:  The Little Foxes 
 1982:  Othello
 1983:  Private Lives
 1992:  Saint Joan (National Actors Theatre) 
 1993:  Timon of Athens  (Nominated - Drama Desk Award)
 1994:  The Government Inspector 
 1995:  Uncle Vanya

Off-Broadway
 1958:  The Golden Six
 1962:  Ten Nights in a Barroom
 1983:  The Lady and the Clarinet
 2007:  Fugue

Repertory Theater of Lincoln Center 
 1965 The Country Wife
 1966 Yerma
 1967:  The Little Foxes & Galileo
 1968:  St. Joan & Tiger at the Gates
 1970:  Beggar on Horseback
 1971:  Mary Stuart
 1972:  Narrow Road to the Deep North

Stratford Festival, Canada
 1967:  Richard III
 1968:  Midsummer Night's Dream
 1969:  Satyricon
 1970:  School for Scandal
 1981:  A Comedy of Errors
 1982:  The Tempest, Arms and the Man & Mary Stuart
 1983:  Love's Labour's Lost & Much Ado About Nothing
 1985:  King Lear
 1989:  The Merchant of Venice
 1991:  Timon of Athens
 1992:  The Tempest & Measure for Measure
 1994:  Twelfth Night & 2 One-Act Plays by Moliere

Guthrie Theatre. Minneapolis 
 1971:  Taming of the Shrew
 1972:  Oedipus
 1973:  School for Scandal

New York Shakespeare Festival
 1979:  Julius Caesar & Coriolanus
 1984:  The Golem
 1994:  The Merry Wives of Windsor

Mark Taper Forum. Los Angeles 
 1979:  The Tempest

Long Wharf Theatre. New Haven 
 1982:  Two by A.M. (Arthur Miller) 
 1983:  The Lady and the Clarinet

Royal Exchange Theatre. Manchester U.K. 
 1987:  The Bluebird of Unhappiness 

Seattle Repertory Theatre
 1987:  The Caucasian Chalk Circle

Hartford Stage Company 
 1992:  Heartbreak House

Lincoln Center Theatre. New York 
 1998:  Ah,  Wilderness!

Royal Shakespeare Company
 1999:  Timon of Athens (adaptation)

The Berkshire Theatre Festival
 1966:  The Skin of Our Teeth
 1966:  The Cretan Women
 1966:  The Merchant of Venice

Classical compositions

Principal performances
Tenso
 1962: White House & Carnegie Hall
 1963: Broadcast, Brazil Television and Japanese Television
Canso
 1964: Tanglewood (de Varon)
 1965: Town Hall, New York
Planh
 1966: Festival de Musique Americaine Contemporaine, Radio diffusion Television Francaise, Paris
 1968: Monday Evening Concerts, Los Angeles; Tanglewood
 1969: Stratford Festival, Canada
 1971: New York Philharmonic Encounter Series (Pierre Boulez)
The Midsummer Night's Dream Show
 1971: New England Conservatory Chorus, Jordan Hall, Boston
 1973: Speculum Musicae, Burgess, Gagnon, Whitney Museum, NY
Oedipus The King (Oratorio)
 1973: Speculum Musicae, Burgess, Gagnon at the Whitney Museum, NY
 2016: BBC Orchestra and Chorus, BBC Radio 3
Crepuscule
 1974: Chamber Music Society of Lincoln Center
 1984: Chamber Music Society of Lincoln Center
 1987: Y Chamber Soloists, New York (Jaime Laredo)
 2004: Chamber Music Society of Lincoln Center
The Charleston Concerto
 1976: U.S Bicentennial performances in Charleston and New York
Variations on a Theme of Kurt Weill
 1977: Naumburg Award. Performed by Empire Brass Quintet at Tully Hall, Lincoln Center (American Tour 1977–1984)
 1978: Brooklyn Philharmonic at the Brooklyn Academy of Music
 1982:Empire Brass Quintet at Sanders Theatre, Harvard University
 1995: Meridian Brass Quintet (International Tour & Recording)
 2018: Israel Philharmonic at the Wallis Annenberg Center, Los Angeles
New York Shakespeare Festival Fanfare
 1978: Delacorte Theatre, New York
Chaconne in D minor (Arranged for Brass Quintet)
 1982: Empire Brass Quintet at Sanders Theatre, Harvard University
Birthday Variations for Avery Fisher
 1986: Avery Fisher Hall, Lincoln Center
Trio No. 1 In Celebration
 1989: Performed by Kalichstein-Laredo-Robinson Trio at the 92nd Street Y, New York and Krannert Center, Urbana Illinois. (International Tour, 1990–95, American Tour 2000–present).
 2001: Ouro Preto & Pocos de Caldas, Brazil, (Musitrio)
 2007: Bronfman Chamber Series, Sun Valley, ID
 2008: Rio & Porto Alegre, Brazil, (Musitrio), Gewurzmuehle Zug, Switzerland (Ensemble Chameleon) 
 2013: Maestro Sergio Magnani Hall, Belo Horizonte, Brazil (Musitrio)
Psalm 100
 1990: Fairmount Temple, Cleveland, Ohio
Khlestakov's Lullaby
 1994: Dayton Philharmonic, Dayton, Ohio
Eridos
 1999: European Cultural Centre of Delphi, Greece (Antigoni Goni)
 2000: Concertgebouw, Amsterdam,
 2001:  Royal Academy of Music, London (Antigoni Goni); Carnegie Recital Hall, New York (Antigoni Goni)
 2001: Prague, Czech Republic, (Antigoni, Goni)
Shakespeare and Our Planet
 2001: Lincoln Center Institute (2 concerts & tour)
 2002:  (Gala) Walter Reade Theater, Lincoln Center 
Trio No.2 Reveille
 2011: Performed by Kalichstein-Laredo-Robinson Trio with Sting at the 92nd St. Y, New York
 2013: Kalichstein-Laredo-Robinson Trio, Kennedy Center, Washington DC (& U.S. tour)  
 2013: Ensemble Chameleon. Grosse Halle Gewurzmuhle, Zug, Switzerland. Saal Hofmat, Oberagi, Switzerland
 2018: Kalichstein-Laredo-Robinson Trio, Da Camera Society, Los Angeles
Saudades do Brazil for String Quartet (after Milhaud)
 2020: Quartet Guignard, Sala Sergio Magnani, Belo Horizonte, Brazil

Principal performances as guitarist
1961: Ojai Festival, California
1962: Los Angeles Philharmonic
1962-69: Tanglewood
1962-63: Pierre Boulez Tour
1965, 1966, 1967: Marlborough Festival
1966, 1967: Boston Symphony Orchestra
1966-72: New York Philharmonic
1966: Stravinsky Festival, Lincoln Center
1966: Festival de Musique Americaine Contemporaine, Paris
1971, 1974, 1978, 1981, 1984, 1985: Chamber Music Society of Lincoln Center
1987, 1993: Chamber Music at the Y, New York

Filmography

Composer
 Great Performances (1 episode) (1975)
 Nanook of the North (1976)
 Simon (1980)
 Eyewitness (1981)
 Strong Medicine (1981)
 I'm Dancing as Fast as I Can (1982)
 The Tempest (TV Movie) (1983)
 Behind The Scenes with David Hockney (1992)

Consultant
 Charles Munch Final Concert with the Boston Symphony, WGBH (1962)
 Nashville Star, NBC, USA Network (2003-2008)
 Michael Buble’s Christmas in New York (with Justin Bieber), NBC (2011)
 Casanova, Amazon Studios (2015)
 Israel Philharmonic Global Gala (hosted by Helen Mirren), Livestream on Israel Philharmonic Orchestra website (2020)

Discography

Composer
 Doctor Selavy's Magic Theatre (1974, 2011)
 Elephant Steps (1974, 2013)
 New American Music Vol. 2. Planh (1975, 2004)
 Sweet Airs That Give Delight, Shakespeare songs (1992)
 Legacies: Piano Trios by Zwilich, Pärt, Kirchner & Silverman (1996)
 Age of Influence, Variations on a Theme of Kurt Weill (1996)
 Kinematic, In Celebration (2002)
 Hymn to the Muse, Eridos (2016)

Guitarist
Selected credits include:
 Mahler Symphony No. 7 (Leonard Bernstein, 1967)
 Footlifters (Gunther Schuller 1975, 2005)
 Threepenny Opera, guitar, banjo, Hawaiian guitar (1976, 2010)
 Marlboro Music Festival 40th Anniversary (1984, 1990)
 Brasileirinho (Paula Robison, 1993)

Arranger
Major arranger credits include:
 Songs From The Capeman, Paul Simon (1997)
 Hourglass, Another Day, Enough To Be On Your Way James Taylor (1997)
 You're the One, Darling Lorraine, The Teacher, Paul Simon (2000)

Conductor
 Threepenny Opera LP (1976) CD (2004)
 Timon of Athens, Duke Ellington (1993)

Awards
1970 - Obie Award for Outstanding Achievement, Elephant Steps
1973 - Drama Desk Award for Most Promising Composer, Dr. Selavy's Magic Theatre
1977 – Grammy Award nomination for Best Opera Recording, Threepenny Opera
1979 - Drama Desk Award nomination for Outstanding Incidental Music, Bent
1983 - Obie Award (Special Citation) for The Mother Of Us All
1993 - Grammy Award nomination for Best Classical Performance Soloist, Concerto
1997 – Grammy Award winner for Best Pop Album, Hourglass
 2000 - Grammy Award nomination as arranger for Album of the Year, You're The One
 2018 – Zubin Mehta Lifetime Achievement Award

References

External links
BMI Database
Official Website

1938 births
Living people
Boston University College of Fine Arts alumni
20th-century American composers
20th-century American guitarists
20th-century American male musicians
Broadway composers and lyricists
Broadway music directors
American male composers
American male guitarists
American classical guitarists
American people of Russian-Jewish descent
Jewish American composers
21st-century American Jews